Rogier Wassen (born 9 August 1976) is a Dutch tennis player who competed regularly on the ATP Tour primarily as a doubles player.

Wassen reached his highest doubles ranking on the ATP Tour on 10 September 2007 when he became World No. 24. The right-hander has won three ATP doubles titles. The Heineken Open in Auckland, New Zealand, in 2006 and 2007 teaming up with Andrei Pavel and Jeff Coetzee respectively. In 2007 he won the Ordina Open in 's-Hertogenbosch, Netherlands, again with Jeff Coetzee. In 2009, he reached the finals of the 2009 Hall of Fame Tennis Championships in Newport, Rhode Island, partnering with Michael Kohlmann.

He is nicknamed "Da Professor" by good friend and doubles partner Dustin Brown.
He returned in doubles at 2013 Marburg Open, in partnership with Artem Sitak, losing in the first round against Vahid Mirzadeh and Denis Zivkovic

Performance timelines

Singles

Doubles

Mixed doubles

ATP Career Finals

Doubles: 10 (5 titles, 5 runner-ups)

ATP Challenger and ITF Futures finals

Singles: 9 (5–4)

Doubles: 50 (27–23)

External links
 
 
 

1976 births
Living people
Dutch expatriate sportspeople in Germany
Dutch male tennis players
People from Roermond
Sportspeople from Limburg (Netherlands)